Eero Hirvonen (born 30 January 1996) is a Finnish Nordic combined skier.

Career
He was born in Laukaa. He debuted in the World Cup in the 2015–16 season in Lahti, Finland on the 6th of March 2016, finishing 33rd in the Large Hill. His best result in the world cup is 2nd place in the 2016–17 World Cup in Lahti, Finland in January 2017.

Together with Ilkka Herola, he won the 2 x 7,5 km team sprint on the 9th of February 2019, in front of their home crowd in Lahti.

Record

Olympic Games

World Championships

World Cup

Individual Podiums

Team Podiums

References

1996 births
Living people
Finnish male Nordic combined skiers
Nordic combined skiers at the 2018 Winter Olympics
Nordic combined skiers at the 2022 Winter Olympics
Olympic Nordic combined skiers of Finland
People from Laukaa
Sportspeople from Central Finland
21st-century Finnish people